D'Amato is an Italian surname. Notable people with the surname include:

Al D'Amato (born 1937), former New York politician
Alice, & Asia D'Amato (born 2003), Italian artistic gymnasts
Armand Paul D'Amato (21st century), American politician
Barbara D'Amato (born 1938), American novelist
Brian D'Amato (21st century), American author and sculptor
C. Richard D'Amato (21st century), American attorney
Cus D'Amato (1908–1985), American boxing manager and trainer
David D'Amato (21st century), Usenet celebrity
Federico Umberto D'Amato (1919–1996), Italian intelligence agent
Giovanni Antonio D'Amato the younger (circa 1535-1598), Italian painter
Helen D'Amato, Maltese politician and educator
Joe D'Amato (1936–1999), Italian director
John D'Amato (died 1992), Italian-American mobster
Keira D'Amato (born 1984), American distance runner
Lisa D'Amato (born 1981), American fashion model
Mike D'Amato (American football) (born 1943), American college and professional football player
Peter D'Amato (21st century), American businessperson
Paul D'Amato (actor) (born c. 1948), American actor

Characters 
Leo D'Amato, a character in the television series Veronica Mars
Phil D'Amato, a NYPD forensic detective
Carli D'Amato, a character from the British sitcom The Inbetweeners portrayed by Emily Head
 Lt. D'Amato, a character in episode That Which Survives from Star Trek: The Original Series.

See also
 Amato (disambiguation)
 Damato

Italian-language surnames